Don McLean is the third studio album by American singer-songwriter Don McLean, released in 1972, peaking at number 23 on the Billboard 200 chart. It was reissued by BGO Records in 1996. The photo on the cover of the album was taken overlooking the Village of Cold Spring, NY.

Track listing
All tracks composed by Don McLean, except where indicated.

"Dreidel" - 3:45
"Bronco Bill's Lament" - 3:36
"Oh, My What a Shame" - 3:30
"If We Try" - 3:30
"The More You Pay (The More It's Worth)" - 2:51 
"Narcisissima" 3:53
"Falling Through Time" - 3:44
"On the Amazon" (Vivian Ellis, Clifford Grey, Greatrex Newman) - 3:17 
"Birthday Song" - 2:34
"The Pride Parade" - 4:31

Chart positions

Personnel
Don McLean - guitar, vocals
Warren Bernhardt - piano on "Oh My What a Shame"
Dick Hyman - piano on "On the Amazon"
Ralph MacDonald - percussion, conga
Ed Trickett - hammered dulcimer
Don Brooks - harmonica
Howard "Buzz" Feiten - guitar
Neil Larsen - piano
Tony Levin - bass on "Dreidel" and "Birthday Song"
Chris Parker - drums
George Ricci - cello
Bob Rothstein - bass, vocals
Russ Savakus - bass, violin, vocals
Ed Freeman - string arrangements
West Forty Fourth Street Rhythm and Noise Choir - chorus
Technical
Tom Flye, Dennis Ferrante, Ed Sprigg, Rod O'Brien - engineer
John Olson - cover photography

Releases
 CD	Don McLean Beat Goes On / BGO Records	 2011

References

External links
 

Don McLean albums
1972 albums
United Artists Records albums
Albums recorded at Record Plant (New York City)